Valley Youth Theatre (VYT) is a community theatre located in Phoenix, Arizona, United States. Established in 1989, VYT produces six mainstage shows each season, two of which are produced at the Herberger Theater Center.

Affiliations
 National recognition by Theatre Communications Group.
 Multiple appearances of Oscar awarded actress Emma Stone.

Community service
Each season, more than 4,600 inner-city students attend VYT mainstage performance and are given free books through a "Literacy and The Arts" outreach program
Each year, more than six hundred children, representing numerous social service organizations throughout the Valley, attend a free performance and are given a complimentary lunch through an annual "Sponsor-A-Seat" program.

Facility
Valley Youth Theatre performs in its renovated facility in Copper Square in downtown Phoenix, Arizona.

An old storefront was gutted in 1998 and rebuilt to include a  proscenium stage with orchestra pit, 202 seat continental-style audience seating, a lobby with box office, and "backstage" areas: a lighting and sound booth, small scene and costume shops, and rehearsal and dressing rooms.

History
1989: Established.
1992: First permanent home in the basement of Tower Plaza.
1999: New permanent home at Copper Square in downtown Phoenix.

Notable alumni
Max Crumm
Kimiko Glenn
Chelsea Kane
Columbus Short
Jordin Sparks
Emma Stone

External links
 http://vyt.com/

References

Theatre companies in Arizona
Theatres in Arizona
Youth theatre companies
Culture of Phoenix, Arizona